IceChat is a full-featured graphical IRC client for Windows. Its current version is open-source and released under the GPLv2 license.

Features
IceChat is able to connect to multiple servers at the same time, optionally with SSL and/or over IPv6. Connection via SASL can be made on networks that support the protocol.

IceChat supports different encoding for each server. DCC and CTCP are supported.

The client can be run in tabbed document interface or multiple-windows mode for channels and queries, or just as detached/independent windows for specific channels or queries.

IceChat supports a customizable color set and a flexible engine which allows the user to define different colors for GUI elements and IRC messages and actions. That, in addition to the customizable graphically rendered emoticons, provides a highly configurable interface. The software comes with several preinstalled themes and supports additional user themes.

IceChat includes a mechanism to add plugins. By default, it offers a message-highlight plugin and has several more on its download page, provided by the author.

OS-support
IceChat 9 runs on all Windows-versions from 7 and later.

IceChat 7 runs on all Windows-versions up until and including Windows 8.

IceChat 7 runs under Wine.

History
Paul Vanderzee tells on his site's history page  that the first version of IceChat was available back in July 2000 and was called sIRC.

The next version, VClient was released back in July 2001 and soon was replaced with the very first IceChat Version 2 in October 2001.

IceChat version 3.0 was released to the public in April 2002 and was the first to support emoticons.

Next came IceChat 4, in January 2003, which was the first to support scripting.

The next version, IceChat 5, was co-written with another developer, IRBMe. It was first released in October 2003 and was the longest-lived version, with the last updated version 5.50 released in January 2005.

True to the client's history, IceChat 6, which was already in the works in May 2004, was a complete re-write, this time in C#, the .NET language. It was also made to be open-source, but was never released to the public.

Instead, a new version, IceChat 7 was born in March 2005. It was to be based on IceChat 5 but with a re-design of the GUI. The first alpha was introduced in June 2005. The full release of IceChat 7 came on September 30, 2006 and the latest build, v7.80, was released December 15, 2014.

The current version, IceChat 9, is again a brand new code base. Its development started in January 2009, in C# using the .NET 4.52.

Distribution
IceChat's source code is available on GitHub, where it was moved from CodePlex. It has several CMD files, in the format of BuildIceChat(xxx).cmd which allow all users to build the .exe with no coding knowledge or any compiler installed.

IceChat is also offered as a portable edition on the site's download page.

See also

Comparison of Internet Relay Chat clients

References

External links

Internet Relay Chat clients
Free Internet Relay Chat clients
Windows Internet Relay Chat clients